Tshujido Seaside Park  is a 19.9-hectare Kanagawa prefectural city park, located on the west coast of Tsujido, Fujisawa City, Kanagawa, Japan. It has been selected as one of the 50 best parks in Kanagawa.

History
The park opened on the site of the former Tsujido Exercise Area of the Japanese Imperial Navy, and later the United States Navy in Japan.
March 7, 1971 - The opening ceremonies were held
April 1, 1971 - Officially opened
1999 - Renovation completed

Main facilities
Jumbo swimming pool (charged)
Jogging course (free)
Jogging is a popular sport in this park. Parkrun (5 km) starts every Saturday at 8:00 am, from the "Southern Sail" monument.
Transportation Exhibition Hall (charged)
Traffic Education Park for Children
Sky Cycle (charged) 
Bicycle riding & Kart racing (free)
A pedestrian traffic light with the shape of a human Astro Boy is installed. [3]
Odakyu Electric Railway's 2600 type train car (Kuha 2658) 
Parking areas - 782 cars (charged)

Transportation
From the south exit of Tsujido Station on the JR Tokaido Line, take the "Tsuji 03" bus bound for Tsujido Housing Complex via Takasago / Tsujido West Coast and get off at "Tsujido Saeaside Park Entrance". From the south exit of Tsujido Station, take the bus bound for Kugenuma Garage via Shoyo Junior High School and get off at Tsujido Seaside Park.

See also 
Kanagawa Prefecture's Visitors attractions and places of interest

References

External links 

Tsujido Seaside Park (Kanagawa Prefecture) (in Japanese)
Tsujido Seaside Park (in Japanese)
Tsujido Seaside Park with Children (in Japanese)

Parks and gardens in Kanagawa Prefecture
Fujisawa, Kanagawa